Sundown on the Prairie is a 1939 American Western film directed by Albert Herman and written by William L. Nolte and Edmond Kelso. The film stars Tex Ritter, Dorothy Fay, Horace Murphy, Karl Hackett, Charles King and Hank Worden. The film was released on February 8, 1939, by Monogram Pictures.

Plot

Cast          
Tex Ritter as Tex
Dorothy Fay as Ruth Graham
Horace Murphy as Ananias
Karl Hackett as Jack Hendricks
Charles King as Nate Dorgan 
Hank Worden as Hank
Frank Ellis as Chuck 
Wally West as Slim
Ernie Adams as Blackie
Frank LaRue as Graham
Edward Peil Sr. as John 
Junita Street as Saloon Singer

References

External links
 

1939 films
American Western (genre) films
1939 Western (genre) films
Monogram Pictures films
Films directed by Albert Herman
American black-and-white films
1930s English-language films
1930s American films